One Week at a Time was an Australian Football League analysis show on One. Throughout the AFL season, it looked at the latest news, drama and issues concerning the AFL. It featured a panel of host Stephen Quartermain and former players Robert Walls and Luke Darcy.

A special guest (either a player or coach) sat on the panel for half the length of the show for an interview and to discuss prominent issues with the three presenters. The show also presented weekly nominees for the AFL's Mark of the Year and Goal of the Year awards.

One Week at a Time (NRL)
In 2011, an NRL version of the same name premiered on One. However, in September 2011, this version of the show was axed due to poor ratings. In 2012 due to Network Ten losing the broadcasting rights to the AFL, One Week at a Time would be cancelled.

See also
 List of Australian television series

References

10 Bold original programming
2009 Australian television series debuts
2011 Australian television series endings
Australian rules football television series
English-language television shows